The Manhattan Railway Company was an elevated railway company in Manhattan and the Bronx, New York City, United States. It operated four lines: the Second Avenue Line, Third Avenue Line, Sixth Avenue Line, and Ninth Avenue Line.

History

19th century 
By the late 1870s, the elevated railways in Manhattan were operated by two companies, the Metropolitan Elevated Railway (Sixth Avenue) and New York Elevated Railroad (Third and Ninth Avenues). The Metropolitan also began constructing a line above Second Avenue. The Manhattan Railway Company was chartered on December 29, 1875, and leased both companies on May 20, 1879. 

The company was the subject of investigation by the New York State Legislature's Hepburn Committee which exposed a scheme that involved barely legal business practices and massive  watering of the company's stock in order to raise its nominal value from $2 million to $15 million.  The exposure of the shady business practices of the company led the Hepburn Committee to propose an act of the legislature outlawing fictitious "ownership" of railroads via leases and related stock watering schemes.

From 1881 the Third Avenue Line and the Sixth Avenue Line were in service 24/7. The Suburban Rapid Transit Company, operating the Third Avenue Line in the Bronx, was leased on June 4, 1891; all three companies were eventually merged into the Manhattan Railway Company in February 1890. 

Richard Croker, boss of Tammany Hall, was in the newspapers in 1899 after a disagreement with Jay Gould's son, George Gould, president of the Manhattan Railway Company, when Gould refused Croker's attempt to attach compressed-air pipes to the Elevated company's structures. Croker owned many shares of the New York Auto-Truck Company, a company which would have benefited from the arrangement. In response to the refusal, Croker used Tammany influence to create new city laws requiring drip pans under structures in Manhattan at every street crossing and the requirement that the railroad run trains every five minutes with a $100 violation for every instance.

20th century 
The Interborough Rapid Transit Company, incorporated in April 1902 as the operating company for its first subway line, signed a 999-year lease on the Manhattan Railway Company lines on April 1, 1903, over a year before the subway opened.

Finally, after 60 or more years of service, and after having operated under a series of companies and jurisdictions, mainly the IRT, the elevated lines began to disappear, with the first line closing in 1938, and the final section closing in 1973:
 service on the Sixth Avenue Line ended in 1938.
 the Ninth Avenue Line south of 155th Street was closed in 1940, while the section from 155th Street north into the Bronx was continued as the "Polo Grounds Shuttle" until 1958.
 the final section of the Second Avenue Line closed in 1942.
 service on the Manhattan section of the Third Avenue Line was phased out in the early 1950s and ended in 1955, while the service on the Bronx section terminated in 1973.

Substation 7, built by the company around 1898 to convert alternating current to direct current, survives at 1782 Third Avenue, at 99th Street and is on the National Register of Historic Places. The contemporaneous 74th Street Powerhouse at York Avenue supplies electricity for Consolidated Edison.

See also
 The Hepburn Committee
 George Jay Gould
 Frank K. Hain, longtime general manager

References

External links
Manhattan Railway Company photography collection at the Museum of the City of New York

Passenger rail transport in New York City
Defunct New York (state) railroads
Defunct public transport operators in the United States
Predecessors and affiliates of the Interborough Rapid Transit Company